Bear Gulch Reservoir is a reservoir in the town of Woodside, California. It is fed by water diverted by two dams on nearby Bear Creek.

As a drinking water reservoir, it is not open to the public, except for horseback riding as its trails or not are only used for cars from the California water service and horses.

Mountain lion and Bobcats are occasionally sighted in the area of the reservoir. The area of Bear Gulch Creek was named after an 1850 incident when a man hauling logs was mauled by a grizzly bear with cubs.

If the reservoir dam fails, portions of Woodside and unincorporated West Menlo Park may be subject to inundation.

This reservoir should not be confused with another one of the same name within Pinnacles National Park.

See also
List of dams and reservoirs in California
List of lakes in California
List of lakes in the San Francisco Bay Area

References

Reservoirs in San Mateo County, California
Reservoirs in California
Reservoirs in Northern California